Sirdan (also Romanized as Sīrdān; also known as Sardān and Serdan) is a city in Tarom Sofla District, Qazvin County, Qazvin Province, Iran. At the 2006 census its population was 462, in 182 families.

References 

Qazvin County
Cities in Qazvin Province